The Swimming competition at the 10th All-Africa Games was held on 5–10 September 2011 at the Zimpeto Olympic Pool in Maputo, Mozambique. It featured 46 long course (50m) events, 6 of which are disability/Paralympic classification. All events were prelims/finals format, except the 800 and 1500 freestyles, which was a timed final (each entrance swims one time, fastest heat swims at night).

Event schedule

m= men's event, w= women's event, S6-S10= disability classification
Prelims begin daily at 9:00 a.m., finals at 5:00 p.m.

Participating nations
25 nations entered in Swimming at the 2011 All Africa Games:

Results

Men's results

Women's results

Medal standings
Swimming medal standings upon completion of the competition are:

References

External links
Swimming Medallists by Event
Swimming Medal Standings

2011 All-Africa Games
Swimming in Mozambique
Swimming at the African Games